Conley (from O′Conghaile, Ó Conghalaigh) is a surname of Irish origin. It is a variant spelling of Connelly and Connolly. It is listed in the census of 1659 as coming from the city of Dublin. O'Connolly was a principal name of Monaghan.

People with the surname

Arts and letters

 Darby Conley (born 1970), American cartoonist
 Philip Mallory Conley (1887–1979), American historian
 Robert Conley (reporter) (1928–2013), American reporter
 Robert J. Conley (1940–2014), Cherokee author
 Tom Conley (philologist) (born 1943), American philologist
 Willy Conley (born 1958), American photographer

Business

 Chip Conley (born 1960), American hotelier
 Kerry Conley (1866–1924), American businessman and politician
 Lyda Conley (1874–1946), American lawyer
 Rosemary Conley (born 1946), English businesswoman, author and broadcaster
 William Henry Conley (1840–1897), American industrialist and philanthropist

Entertainment
 Arthur Conley (1946–2003), American soul singer
 Bayless Conley, American pastor and television personality
 Brian Conley (born 1961), English comedian
 The Brian Conley Show (1992–2002)
 Chris Conley (born 1980), American musician
 Clint Conley, American rock and roll musician
 Corinne Conley (born 1929), American actress
 Darlene Conley (1934–2007), Irish-American actress
 David Conley (musician) (born 1953), American bassist
 Earl Thomas Conley (1941–2019), American country music singer and composer
 Eugene Conley (1908–1981), American tenor
 Jack Conley (actor), American actor
 Joe Conley (1928–2013), American actor
 Lige Conley (1897–1937), American actor
 Onest Conley (1906–1989), American film actor
 Renie Conley (1901–1992), American costume designer
 Robert Conley (music producer) (born 1973), American record producer, programmer and engineer
 Shannon Conley, American voice actor, and vocalist

Education
 J. Michael "Mike" Conley, American teacher (born 1936), see J. Michael Conley Elementary School
 Jean Conley, American teacher (died 1982), see Conley-Caraballo High School

Military
Edgar Thomas Conley – Civil War – Pvt. 2nd Md. Inf. C.S.A. KIA 1863  
Edgar Thomas Conley (1874–1956), United States Army, Major General and Adjutant General of the U.S. Army
Edgar Thomas Conley Jr. (1907–1993), United States Army, Brig. General

Politics and law

 Thomas Young Conley (1809–1887),  Maryland House of Delegates 1868–1870
Andrew Conley (1880/81–1952), British trade unionist
 Benjamin F. Conley (1815–1886), American politician (Republican)
 Daniel F. Conley, District Attorney for Suffolk County, Massachusetts
 Dean Conley (born 1946), American politician (Democrat)
 Gerard Conley Sr. (1930–2018), American politician (Democrat)
 Gerard Conley Jr., American lawyer and politician (Democrat)
 John Conley (Wisconsin politician) (born 1828), American politician (Republican)
 Robert M. "Bob" Conley (born 1965), American pilot and politician (Democrat)
 William G. Conley (1866–1940), Governor of West Virginia (Republican)
 William M. Conley (born 1956), American judge

Religion
 James D. Conley (born 1955), American bishop

Science
 Catharine Conley, NASA's Planetary Protection Officer
 Charles C. Conley (1933–1984), American mathematician
 Conley index theory, named after Charles Conley
 Conley–Zehnder theorem, named after Charles Conley and Eduard Zehnder
 Dalton Conley (born 1969), American sociologist
 Frances K. Conley, American Neurologist

Sports

 Adam Conley (born 1990), American baseball player
 Bob Conley (baseball) (born 1934), American baseball player
 Cale Conley (born 1992), American racing driver
 Chris Conley (American football) (born 1992), American football wide receiver
 Frankie Conley (1890–1952), American boxer
 Gene Conley (1930–2017), American baseball and basketball player
 Gareon Conley (born 1995), American football cornerback
 Jack Conley (Australian rules footballer) (born 1923), Australian rules footballer
 Jack Conley (English footballer) (1920–1991), English footballer
 Jason Conley (born 1981), American basketball player
 Jim Conley (born c. 1943), American football player
 Kim Conley (born 1986), American track and field athlete
 Larry Conley (born 1944), American basketball player
 Leonard Conley (born 1968), American football wide receiver and linebacker
 Mike Conley Sr. (born 1962), American triple jumper
 Mike Conley Jr. (born 1987), American basketball player
 Scott Conley (American football) (born 1947), American football coach
 Scott Conley (rugby league) (born 1973), Australian rugby league footballer
 Snipe Conley (1894–1978), American baseball pitcher
 Steve Conley (linebacker) (born 1972), American football player
 Steve Conley (running back) (born 1949), American football player
 T. J. Conley (born 1985), American football punter
 Tim Conley (born 1958), American golfer

Miscellaneous
 Jim Conley (born c. 1884), see Leo Frank

See also
Conley Byrd (1925–2014), Justice of the Arkansas Supreme Court
Comley (surname)

References

Anglicised Irish-language surnames
Surnames of Irish origin